A list of films produced in the United Kingdom in 1965 (see 1965 in film):

1965

See also
1965 in British music
1965 in British radio
1965 in British television
1965 in the United Kingdom

References

External links
 

1965
Films
British